Blenheim is the English name of Blindheim, a village in Bavaria, Germany, which was the site of the Battle of Blenheim in 1704. Almost all places and other things called Blenheim are named directly or indirectly in honour of the battle.

Places

United Kingdom
 Blenheim, Leeds, an inner city area of the English city of Leeds, West Yorkshire
 Blenheim, Oxfordshire, a civil parish in England
Blenheim Palace, a large stately home built for the victor of the Battle of Blenheim, John Churchill, 1st Duke of Marlborough

United States

 Blenheim (Maryland), the historic Maryland estate of the Lees of Virginia
 Blenheim, New Jersey, an unincorporated community in Gloucester Township, New Jersey
 Blenheim, New York, a town in Schoharie County, New York
 Blenheim, South Carolina, a town in Marlboro County, South Carolina
 Blenheim, Virginia, an unincorporated area in Albemarle County, Virginia
 Blenheim (Blenheim, Virginia), a historic home and farm complex in Albemarle County, Virginia
 Blenheim Vineyards, modern winery in Albemarle County, Virginia honoring late 18th century winery nearby 
 Blenheim (Spring Mills, Virginia), a historic home in Campbell County, Virginia
 Historic Blenheim, a 19th-century Greek Revival farm house near Fairfax, Virginia
 Blenheim (Ballsville, Virginia), a historic home in Powhatan County, Virginia
 Blenheim (Wakefield Corner, Virginia), a historic home in Westmoreland County, Virginia

Other places

 Blenheim, Queensland, a rural locality in Australia
 Blenheim, Ontario, a town in Chatham-Kent, Ontario, Canada
 Blenheim, Jamaica, a place on the List of National Heritage Sites in Jamaica
 Blenheim, New Zealand, a town in the north of the South Island of New Zealand
 Blenheim Reef, part of the Chagos Archipelago

Military
 Battle of Blenheim, a 1704 battle of the War of the Spanish Succession
 , several ships of the Royal Navy
 Bristol Blenheim, a World War II-era light bomber used primarily by the Royal Air Force

Plants
 Blenheim Orange, a cultivar of apple
 Blenheim apricot, a variety of apricot
 Blenheim Royal (Schreiner 1990), a tall, blue, bearded iris

Other uses
 Blenheim (horse) (1927–1958), a Thoroughbred racehorse that won the Epsom Derby
 , several vessels by that name
 Blenheim, the brown/red and white Cavalier King Charles Spaniel
 Blenheim Ginger Ale, a drink originally bottled in Blenheim, South Carolina, United States
 Blenheim High School, a school in Surrey, United Kingdom
 Blenheim Horse Trials, a competition held at Blenheim Palace
 Blenheim Music and Camping Festival, a two-day music festival held in the Clare Valley in South Australia